Alkire is a surname. Notable people with the surname include:

Darr H. Alkire (1903–1977), United States Air Force general
Elbern Alkire (1907–1981), American guitarist
Jason Alkire, American fashion designer
Sabina Alkire (* 1969), german academic

See also
Haus Alkire, an American fashion label
Alkire House, a historic house in Westerville, Ohio, United States